Little River Falls is located within the Little River Canyon National Preserve in Alabama, United States. It marks the beginning of the Little River Canyon.  On April 8, 2014, the falls set a record water flow of more than 11,000 cubic feet per second.  This broke the old record set in 1964.

References

Landforms of Cherokee County, Alabama
Landforms of DeKalb County, Alabama
Lookout Mountain
Waterfalls of Alabama